Bembix is a large cosmopolitan genus of large, often brightly colored predatory sand wasps, consisting of about 380 species.

List of species (Europe) 
 Bembix bicolor Radoszkowski 1877
 Bembix bidentata Vander Linden 1829
 Bembix cinctella Handlirsch 1893
 Bembix flavescens F. Smith 1856
 Bembix geneana A. Costa 1867
 Bembix megerlei Dahlbom 1845
 Bembix merceti J. Parker 1904
 Bembix oculata Panzer 1801
 Bembix olivacea Fabricius 1787
 Bembix pallida Radoszkowski 1877
 Bembix rostrata (Linnaeus 1758)
 Bembix sinuata Panzer 1804
 Bembix tarsata Latreille 1809
 Bembix turca Dahlbom 1845
 Bembix wagleri Gistel 1857
 Bembix zonata Klug 1835

See also
 List of Bembix species

 Bembix variabilis  McCaffrey, S & Gibson, L 2009   It is an Australian native species that is a pest on hives of the native bee, Tetragonula carbonara

External links
Hymis.de Photographs of Palearctic species.
 McCaffrey, S. & Gibson, L. (2009) Crabronid wasp - Bembix variabilis (Bembix variabilis) Updated on 2/27/2013 1:01:55 PM Available online: PaDIL - http://www.padil.gov.au.

Crabronidae
Apoidea genera
Articles containing video clips
Hymenoptera of Europe